Guam Highway 10 (GH-10) is one of the primary automobile highways in the United States territory of Guam.

Route description
GH-10 begins at a junction off GH-4 near Pago Bay. It trends eastward into the coastal village of Mangilao. GH-32 then spurs off the route towards the University of Guam. GH-10 then turns generally northward and intersects GH-15 before crossing into Barrigada and ending at a junction with GH-8. The road itself continues beyond the intersection into the Tiyan area, formerly Naval Air Station Guam. Although there exists a suffixed GH-10A, it is not in any way connected to GH-10: being located on the other side of Tiyan and primarily serving Antonio B. Won Pat International Airport.

Major intersections

References

10